Hymenobacter terrae is a bacterium from the genus of Hymenobacter which has been isolated from soil from Seoul in Korea.

References 

terrae
Bacteria described in 2017